Raugravine Caroline Elisabeth (19 November 1659, Heidelberg – 7 July 1696, London) was a German noblewoman and daughter of Charles I Louis, Elector Palatine.

Life 

She was born in Heidelberg as a daughter of Charles I Louis, Elector Palatine from his morganatic marriage with Marie Luise von Degenfeld.

On 4th June 1683 she married Meinhardt Schomberg, 3rd Duke of Schomberg and moved to London.

Like her siblings, she kept in touch with her aunt Electress Sophie of Hanover, whose son George I became King of Great Britain and Ireland, and her half-sister Elisabeth Charlotte (Liselotte), Duchess of Orléans, who married a brother of King Louis XIV of France.

She and her husband had four children: Charles Schomberg, Marquess of Harwich, Frederica Mildmay, Countess of Mértola, Lady Caroline Schomberg, and Lady Mary Schomberg. However, Liselotte in one of her letters to Caroline's sister, Raugravine Louise, mentions that the couple had at least eight children. On 3 July 1694, she wrote: "I shudder to think that Caroline [...] already has eight children; [...]."

She is buried with her husband in Westminster Abbey.

References 

1659 births
1696 deaths
Daughters of monarchs